Tyrell Tull (born 6 October 1986) is a Guyanese cricketer. He played in four Twenty20 matches for Guyana in 2006.

See also
 List of Guyanese representative cricketers

References

External links
 

1986 births
Living people
Guyanese cricketers
Guyana cricketers